Talashe Haq is a 1935 Indian film directed by Chimanlal Luhar. Which was the first film of Nargis

Cast 
This is the list of all actors and actress who worked in Talashe Haq

 Yakub
 Jaddan Bai
 Nargis

References

External links

1935 films
1930s Hindi-language films
Indian black-and-white films
Films scored by Jaddan Bai